Donald J. Stoker is an American military historian.

Education
He earned his bachelor's degree in 1989, his Master's of Arts in 1990 from Valdosta State University and his PhD in Military and Diplomatic History from Florida State University, Tallahassee, FL in 1997.

Career
Donald Stoker was a Professor of Strategy and Policy for the U.S. Naval War College’s program at the Naval Postgraduate School in Monterey, California for 18 years. He currently is a Visiting Fellow and Fulbright Visiting Professor of International Relations, Diplomatic Academy of Vienna, Austria.

Publications
 Britain, France, and the Naval Arms Trade in the Baltic, 1919-1939: Grand Strategy and Failure. London: Frank Cass, 2003.  
 Girding for Battle: The Arms Trade in a Global Perspective, 1815 - 1940. Westport, CT: Praeger, 2003.   
 Military Advising and Assistance: From Mercenaries to Privatization, 1815-2007. London: Routledge, 2008.   
 With Harold D. Blanton, and Frederick C. Schneid. Conscription in the Napoleonic Era: A Revolution in Military Affairs? London: Routledge, 2009.   
 The Grand Design: Strategy and the U.S. Civil War. Oxford ; New York : Oxford University Press, 2010.   
 With Kenneth J. Hagan, and Michael T. McMaster. Strategy in the American War of Independence: A Global Approach. Abingdon, Oxon: Routledge, 2010.   
 Clausewitz: His Life and Work. New York : Oxford University Press, 2014.  
 Air Force Advising and Assistance: Developing Airpower in Client States. Helion and Company, 2018. 
 Why America Loses Wars: Limited War and American Strategy Since Korea. Cambridge University Press, 2019.

Awards
The Grand Design was recognized with Fletcher Pratt award for best non-fiction Civil War book of 2010 by the Civil War Round Table of New York and was a Main Selection of the History Book Club.

He was named as an Outstanding Alumnus of Valdosta State University by the Department of History in 2014.

References

External links
Donald Stoker on The Grand Design: Strategy and the U.S. Civil War at the Pritzker Military Museum & Library
Donald Stoker on Clausewitz: His Life and Work at the Pritzker Military Museum & Library

American military historians
American male non-fiction writers
Living people
Valdosta State University alumni
Naval Postgraduate School faculty
People from Salinas, California
Florida State University alumni
Year of birth missing (living people)
Historians from California